Ghost image may refer to:

An image of a ghost
 Spirit photography, an attempt to capture an image of a ghost
Afterimage, an image that continues to appear in the eyes after exposure has ceased
Ghosting (television), an offset replica of a transmitted image in an analogue broadcast
Image persistence, the temporary retention of a picture on LCD and plasma screens
Screen burn-in, the discoloration of a display by non-uniform use

See also
Ghosting (disambiguation)